Events in the year 2023 in Laos.

Incumbents

Events 
Ongoing — COVID-19 pandemic in Laos

 8 February – Inflation in Laos reaches 40.3%, the highest since 2000.

Sports 

 5 – 17 May: Laos will participate in the 2023 Southeast Asian Games.

References 

 

 
2020s in Laos
Years of the 21st century in Laos
Laos
Laos